Misbehavior (lit. "Female Teacher") is a 2016 South Korean psychological thriller film written and directed by Kim Tae-yong. The film stars Kim Ha-neul, Yoo In-young and Lee Won-keun.

Plot
A love triangle between two female teachers and a male student.

Park Hyo-joo is a part time chemistry teacher at a high school. After her colleague goes on a maternity leave, she takes over as the homeroom teacher. However, she becomes envious of the newcomer Cha Hae-young, who became a tenured teacher through her rich connections.

At home, she has to struggle with her deadbeat boyfriend who gaslights her. Eventually, she breaks up with him. One night, Park Hyo-joo discovers Cha Hae-young having sex with a student named Shin Jae-ha. The next morning, she threatens to expose Cha Hae-young unless she breaks up with Shin Jae-ha. In the following days, Park Hyo-joo enrolls Shin Jae-ha in ballet classes, to support him for an upcoming competition. During that time, she seduces the student to cope with loneliness.

Shin Jae-ha wins 2nd place in the competition. Later, he maliciously reveals to Park Hyo-joo that their affair was initiated to give Cha Hae-young leverage over her. Park Hyo-joo's contract isn't renewed. She begs Cha Hae-young to negotiate with her father, the chairman of the board, to which the other woman agrees. Later, at a hotel suite, Cha Hae-young reveals that she was just fooling around with Shin Jae-ha and that she never really loved him. Park Hyo-joo murders her by pouring boiling water over her face. She calls Shin Jae-ha at the room, and they have sex, but he asserts that he only loves Cha Hae-young and not Park Hyo-joo. Afterwards, Shin Jae-ha is devastated to discover Cha Hae-young's corpse. The movie ends with Park Hyo-joo eating at school as the police comes for her.

Cast
Kim Ha-neul as Park Hyo-joo
A restrained part-time instructor at an all-male high school. Emotionally torn, she discovers that her junior Hye-young has nabbed a full-time position at the school through her connections.
Yoo In-young as Choo Hye-young 
Lee Won-keun as Shin Jae-ha
A submissive student, who is keenly aware of his teachers' physical and emotional needs.
Lee Ki-woo as Choi Min-ho 
Lee Hee-joon as Pyo Sang-woo
Gi Ju-bong as Shin Byung-soo
Shin Jae-ha's father.
Kwak Dong-yeon as Yoo Jong-ki 
Lee Geung-young as Board Chairman
Kim Soo-jin as Female Teacher
Lim Hwa-young as Lee Yoon-mi

Awards and nominations

References

External links

Misbehavior at Naver Movies 

South Korean romantic thriller films
2016 films
2010s psychological drama films
2016 drama films
2010s South Korean films
2010s Korean-language films